The 44th Telluride Film Festival was held on September 1–4, 2017, in Telluride, Colorado, United States.

Director Joshua Oppenheimer was appointed as the guest director of the event. Telluride honored Edward Lachman and Christian Bale as the Silver Medallion winners. The Special Medallion was awarded to Katriel Schory of Israeli Film Fund.

Official selections

Main program

Guest Director's Selections
The films were selected and presented by the year's guest director, Joshua Oppenheimer.

Backlot
The selection included behind-the-scene movies and portraits of artists, musicians, and filmmakers.

Filmmakers of Tomorrow

Student Prints
The selection was curated and introduced by Gregory Nava. It selected the best student-produced work around the world.

Calling Cards
The selection was curated by Barry Jenkins. It selected new works from promising filmmakers.

Great Expectations
The selection was curated by Barry Jenkins.

Silver Medallion
Edward Lachman
Christian Bale

Special Medallion
Katriel Schory

References

External links
 

2017 film festivals
2017 in Colorado
44th